Jess and the Ancient Ones is a Finnish psychedelic rock band that was formed in Kuopio in 2010. Some of the members of the band were co-musicians in the Finnish metal band Deathchain. The band has released four albums: The self-titled Jess and the Ancient Ones in 2012, Second Psychedelic Coming: The Aquarius Tapes in 2015, The Horse and Other Weird Tales in 2017, and Vertigo in 2021.

They have also released the 2013 EP Astral Sabbat, which was produced by Tore Stjerna of Necromorbus Studio.

The band had a notable collaboration with Spain's Deadmask in a 7" split release The Deepest Sea / Into Starlit Chambers.

Members
Jess (Jasmin Saarela) – vocals
Thomas Corpse – guitars
Fast Jake – bass
Yussuf – drums and percussion
Abraham – keyboards, organ, synthesizer

Former members
Von Stroh – guitar
Thomas Fiend – guitar and backing vocals (2010–2016)

Discography

Albums

EPs

Other collaborations
2012: "The Deepest Sea" / "Into Starlit Chambers" (split Jess and the Ancient Ones /  Deadmask EP

Singles
2011: "13th Breath of the Zodiac"
2014: "Castaneda"
2015: "In Levitating Secret Dreams"
2021: "Summer Tripping Man"

References

External links
Website
Webshop
Gigs
Bandcamp
Facebook
MySpace

Finnish musical groups
Finnish psychedelic rock music groups
Finnish progressive rock groups